Prauserella salsuginis is a bacterium from the genus Prauserella which has been isolated from the Aiding Lake in Xinjiang, China.

References

Pseudonocardiales
Bacteria described in 2009